Bosler may refer to:

Bosler (surname)
Bosler, Wyoming

See also
 Boßler, a mountain in the Swabian Alps, Baden-Württemberg, Germany